Waun Garnedd-y-filiast is a top of Carnedd y Filiast on the border of the Snowdonia National park near Cerrigydrudion in North Wales. It is part of the Arenig mountain range. It is also a peak in an area of moorland known as the Migneint.

The summit is marked by a few stones in an area of peat hags on a small plateau of bog. Foel Goch (Arenigs), Carnedd Llechwedd-llyfn and Mwdwl-eithin can be seen.

The top was not included in the Nuttall's original list. However, in 1999 it was surveyed to have the following re-ascent 15.1295 m (49 ft 7.5in). Controversy arose due to it not being quite 50 ft. Some walkers choose only to include it in a Metric list along with 600–608 m sub Hewitt summits. However, most walkers regard it as a full Nuttall by now since it rounds up to 50 ft.

References

Cerrigydrudion
Llandderfel
Mountains and hills of Conwy County Borough
Mountains and hills of Gwynedd
Mountains and hills of Snowdonia
Nuttalls